The British Lop is an old pig breed native to the United Kingdom. A large, white pig, it is named for its large ears which hang over its face. The breed was originally developed as an amalgamation of several local lop-eared breeds in England, and came to be known as the British Lop in the 1960s.

History

The earliest records of the breed are from the border of Cornwall and Devon, particularly the area around Tavistock. It is possibly related to similar breeds found around the north-western fringes of Europe, namely the Welsh, with which it was for a period in the 1920s in a combined breed registry, and the Landrace pig breeds of Scandinavia. It may also be related to the Normande pigs of France. 

The breed's first herdbook was published in 1921, subsequent to the popularity of classes at the Devon County Show in that year. By the late 1930s large numbers of purebred Lops were registered, predominantly in the south-west. During the years after the Second World War, the British Government recommended that production be standardised on three breeds (the Large White, Welsh and Landrace) which led to a decline in the numbers of other breeds of pig. During the 1960s and 70s only around 11 breeders kept the British Lop going.

Characteristics

The British Lop is a large, white-skinned pig with lop ears. It is heavy-set, and much deeper in the body than the similar Welsh or Landrace pigs. The breed was developed to be able to support itself primarily on grazing, and is still often raised outdoors. Unlike most surviving British pig breeds, the British Lop appears to have had little or no input from the imported Asian pigs used in much 19th century breeding.

The breed has a good ability to put on lean weight and is particularly noted for a gentle temperament.

Current status

The breed is currently higher in numbers than during the 60s and 70s, but is still listed as endangered by the Rare Breeds Survival Trust.  Clarissa Dickson Wright commented that "The British Lop is rarer than the Giant Panda."

See also
 List of domestic pig breeds

References

External links

 British Lop Pig Society

Pig breeds originating in England
Animal breeds on the RBST Watchlist